Ranjit Bolt OBE (born 1959) is a British playwright and translator.  He was born in Manchester of Anglo-Indian parents and is the nephew of playwright and screenwriter Robert Bolt.  His father is literary critic Sydney Bolt, author of several books including A preface to James Joyce, and his mother has worked as a teacher of English.

Life and career
Bolt was educated at The Perse School and Balliol College, Oxford. He worked as a stockbroker for eight years but "was desperate to escape, any escape route would have done, and translating turned out to be the one".  As well as his plays, he has published a novel in verse, Losing it and a verse translation for children of the fables of La Fontaine, The Hare and the Tortoise. His version of Cyrano de Bergerac opened on New York at the Roundabout Theatre in September 2012, with Douglas Hodge in the title role. His adaptation of Volpone for Sir Trevor Nunn, was produced by the Royal Shakespeare Company in the summer of 2015.

He was awarded the OBE in 2003 for services to literature.

Views
Asked about his approach to translating plays, he has said: 

In August 2014, Bolt was one of 200 public figures who were signatories to a letter to The Guardian opposing Scottish independence in the run-up to September's referendum on that issue.

Publications
Ranjit Bolt has translated many classic plays into English, most of them into verse.  Among his works are:

 L'Invitation au Chateau (aka, Invitation to the Castle and Ring Round the Moon) by Jean Anouilh
 Three Sisters from the play by Anton Chekhov
 The Bacchae by the play by Euripides
 The Liar (1989) from Le Menteur by Pierre Corneille
 The Illusion (1990) from  L'Illusion Comique by Pierre Corneille
 The Real Don Juan (1990) from Don Juan Tenorio by José Zorrilla y Moral 
 Tartuffe (1991 and 2002) from the play by Molière
 Lysistrata (1993) from the play by Aristophanes
 The Venetian Twins (1993) from the play by Carlo Goldoni
 Le Cid (1994) from the play by Pierre Corneille
 The Miser (1995) from L'Avare by Molière
 The Oedipus Plays (1996)
 The Art of Seduction (1997) from La Double Inconstance by Pierre Marivaux
 Cyrano de Bergerac (1995)  from the play by Edmond Rostand
 The Resistible Rise of Arturo Ui (2005) from the play by Bertolt Brecht
 The Marriage of Figaro (2006) from the play by Pierre Beaumarchais
 Merry Wives - The Musical (2006) from The Merry Wives of Windsor by William Shakespeare
 Mirandolina (2006) from The Mistress of the Inn the play by Carlo Goldoni
 The Grouch (2008) from Le Misanthrope by Molière
 Waltz of the Toreadors from the play by Jean Anouilh
 Believe it or not from Le Puff by Eugène Scribe
 George Dandin from the play by Molière
 Hercules from the work by Seneca
 The Idiot from L'Étourdi by Molière
 Scapin from Les Fourberies de Scapin by Molière
 The School for Wives from the play by Molière
 The Sisterhood from Les Femmes Savantes by Molière
 A Flea In Her Ear from the play by Georges Feydeau

Performances of his work
In 2014 he wrote an English version of the text for Mozart's comic opera, The Impresario, which was given by The Santa Fe Opera in Santa Fe, New Mexico in a double bill paired with Igor Stravinsky's The Nightingale. In 2017, his Tartuffe was performed at Stratford Festival in Stratford, Ontario.

References
Notes

'Other sources
Michael Billington, "Comic timing", The Guardian'' (London) 16 October 2006

External links
 Official website
Ranjit Bolt on Doollee.com The Playwrights' Database

English dramatists and playwrights
English translators
People educated at The Perse School
Living people
1959 births
English male dramatists and playwrights
Officers of the Order of the British Empire
English male non-fiction writers